Lisa Bettany (born 3 November 1981)  is a Canadian technology entrepreneur and photographer. She is the cofounder of the iPhone camera app Camera+, which sold over 10 million copies as of 2022.

Biography 
Born to British parents, Bettany grew up in Victoria, British Columbia, where her father was a computer professor.  

She was a competitive figure skater from the age of three until a back injury ended her career at 19. Having grown up around computers, she developed her first blog and her interest in photography while recovering. 

In 2009, Bettany partnered with an international team of six developers to develop Camera+, which launched in June 2010. The app generated revenues of almost $2 million within a year.

Lisa Bettany was included in the 2014 Fast Company Most Creative People in Business 1000 list. Forbes named Bettany as a top female tech entrepreneur in 2012. She has also been featured in Entrepreneur, Elle , The New York Times, Fast Company Labs and ShutterLove.

She serves as a producer at MacHeist and has played the characters of Sophia and Amelia. She was formerly a host on the Canadian gadget show GetConnected''.

References

External links 
 blog
Lisa Bettany photography website
Interview with five tips for developing a successful app, Fast Magazine

1981 births
Living people
Artists from Victoria, British Columbia
Businesspeople from British Columbia
Canadian bloggers
Canadian photographers
Canadian people of British descent